{{DISPLAYTITLE:C22H27N3O}}
The molecular formula C22H27N3O (molar mass: 349.4713 g/mol) may refer to:

 AL-LAD, or 6-allyl-6-nor-LSD
 CUMYL-PINACA, also known as SGT-24

Molecular formulas